is a war shooting gallery arcade video game developed and originally published by SNK on April 26, 1990. It was one of the launch titles for both the Neo Geo MVS (arcade) and Neo Geo AES (home) platforms, in addition to being the only title in the system that does not feature the Neo Geo boot screen in its attract mode, as well as one of the pack-in games for the AES.

Set in a very fictionalized account of the final months of the Vietnam War, the story follow the soldiers Silver and Brown as they enter into the war once again in order to rescue ex-American army scientist Dr. R. Muckly and his daughter Nancy, who were kidnapped and presumably imprisoned in the interior of Vietnam by North Side terrorists (that is implied to be the Viet Cong), while also trying to learn about the responsible author of the act. Initially launched for the Neo Geo MVS, NAM-1975 was later released for both Neo Geo AES and Neo Geo CD in 1991 and 1994 respectively, and has since been re-released through download services for various consoles, among other ways to play it.

NAM-1975 received positive reception from critics upon its release, with praise given to the graphics and digitized voice samples but many were divided in regards to the gameplay, while it received criticism for the music and difficulty. Retrospective reviews for the title have been equally positive in recent years, with reviewers praising the gameplay but criticizing its short length.

Gameplay 

NAM-1975 is a shooting gallery game similar to Cabal and Dynamite Duke where players take control of the soldiers Silver (P1) and Brown (P2), across six stages that take place on Vietnam during the final months of the Vietnam War and defeat the bosses of each level in order to progress through the game. In addition to the single-player mode, the game also features a two-player cooperative multiplayer mode.

The joystick moves both the soldier and the crosshair left and right of the area. The A buttion is used for firing the main weapon where the crosshair is positioned and when held down, players can move the crosshair while keeping the soldiers in the same spot. The B button is used to throw grenades into the position of the crosshair, while the C button enable players to move the soldiers faster to avoid enemy fire when held down. If the joystick is pulled diagonally when running, the soldiers will perform an evasive roll that prevents them from being killed, in addition of dodging enemy fire as well. Once all lives are lost, the game is over unless players insert more credits into the arcade machine to continue playing. If a memory card is present, the player is allowed to save their progress and resume into the last stage the game saved at.

Like many earlier games released by SNK, it is well known for its high difficulty, with the final boss being particularly infamous among players for disabling continues after reaching the end of the last stage and if the players are killed during this battle, it will automatically trigger the bad ending, forcing to restart the game from the beginning in order to achieve the good ending.

Both players begin the game with a standard machine gun with infinite ammo and ten grenades. When certain enemies are killed or certain building structures are brought down, they will drop guns, grenades or other items that can be collected, such as points or 1UPs. The guns that can be picked up during gameplay consists of the Balcan (A more powerful machine gun), a flamethrower capable of only taking out ground units and a missile launcher, while the other grenade-type weapons that can be collected are the spark and napalm bombs. If the players save a female hostage from the enemy, the hostage (named Chris) will help players by shooting at enemies, until the player who rescued her is killed or reaches the end of the area. On occasions, the players are sent into a boss round that takes place in between stages.

Plot 
"The roar of the helicopters overhead snaps us back into reality. We will never forget the nightmare of that summer..." these were the phrases that started the story of Silver and Brown, two soldiers who were recalled back to the Natorm headquarters in the summer of 1975, during the final months of the Vietnam War, in order to rescue the ex-U.S. army scientist Dr. R. Muckly, who was kidnapped and presumably imprisoned in the interior of Vietnam by North Side terrorists, as part of an organized special forces unit. The team proceeds with the mission by going up to Yan river on a boat in order to deceive enemy guard, but their operations are quickly sighted by the terrorists. As a result, the team abandons the boat and they get across Do Nang city to continue the operation, wondering how their plan was figured out by the enemy and after doing so, the team receives a new strategy plan from the headquarters, informing them to aboard an allied plane in order to invade the enemy airport by parachuting, however, the enemy intercepts them in the air and the soldiers begin defending themselves by shooting at the upcoming enemy planes.

Once the team arrive safely into the airport, the soldiers proceed to continue the mission by assaulting the complex, now realizing that there is a spy among them but after the assault of the enemy airport, their communication systems were intercepted by the terrorists and the captain of the unit informed to the soldiers that Nancy Muckly, the daughter of Dr. R. Muckly, was also taken away alongside his father and gave the team new orders to enter into enemy arms factory. Soon after, the team come across with Nancy, who tries to inform them about the true head of the operation before she is killed by an enemy shot on her back.

After capturing an enemy commander, the soldiers proceed to interrogate him about how their plan was quickly found out but the commander is then killed by a sniper, but not before informing the armies that Dr. R. Muckly is a madman who is constructing a gigantic laser cannon to take over the world himself. Despite the intense firepower of the weapon, the troops defeat Dr. R. Muckly and save the world, with the special forces now being regarded as heroes but the war continues in Vietnam.

Development and release 

NAM-1975 holds the distinction for being one of the first, if not the first game to be developed for the Neo Geo platform, in addition to being the only title in the system's library that does not feature the Neo Geo boot screen in its attract mode. There are many references to many famous Vietnam War films in the game such as Apocalypse Now and Full Metal Jacket, especially the latter, with the attract sequence showing one of the characters firing off an M60 machine gun being a clear portray of the shot of Animal Mother firing on the VC sniper in the latter film. The game was also showcased for the first time in North America during the 1990 ACME show in Chicago.

NAM-1975 was initially launched for arcades on April 26, 1990. It was also released for the Neo Geo home system at the same time available to rent or buy. It was re-released for the Neo Geo CD on September 9, 1994 as one of the launch titles for the system, with minimal changes compared to the original MVS and AES versions. The game has received multiple re-releases in recent years on various digital distribution platforms such as the Virtual Console, PlayStation Network, Nintendo eShop and Xbox Live. NAM-1975 was also one of the 20 pre-loaded games included on the Neo Geo X.

Controversy 
When the Neo Geo AES version was originally launched in Europe, the cover art of copies released in the region were subsequently censored due to the female character on the front having a bare thigh and cleavage exposed. As such, many cartridges have a black mark over the exposed parts with a permanent marker to disguise it for overseas marketing.

Reception 

In Japan, Game Machine listed NAM-1975 on their December 15, 1990 issue as being the twenty-second most-successful table arcade unit of the month, outperforming titles such as Out Zone. The game received positive reception from critics when it was originally released. Super Teeter of GameFan gave a positive outlook to the game in their June 1999 issue, praising various aspects of the game but also pointing out the high difficulty level.

Retrospective reviews 

In recent years, NAM-1975 has received positive reception from critics.

In 2014, HobbyConsolas identified NAM-1975 as one of the twenty best games for the Neo Geo AES.

Notes

References

External links 
 NAM-1975 at GameFAQs
 NAM-1975 at Giant Bomb
 NAM-1975 at Killer List of Videogames
 NAM-1975 at MobyGames

1990 video games
ACA Neo Geo games
Arcade video games
Cabal shooters
Cooperative video games
D4 Enterprise games
Multiplayer and single-player video games
Neo Geo games
Neo Geo CD games
Nintendo Switch games
Pack-in video games
PlayStation Network games
PlayStation 4 games
Scrolling shooters
SNK games
Vietnam War video games
Video games set in Vietnam
Video games with alternate endings
Virtual Console games
Video games developed in Japan
Xbox One games
Hamster Corporation games